Sean Rogerson (born September 30, 1977) is a Canadian actor and former photomodel, known for his role as Lance Preston in the horror films, Grave Encounters and Grave Encounters 2.

Filmography
 2004: Tru Calling (TV Series) - The Longest Day (Harrison's Buddy #1)
 2005: The Collector (TV Series) - The Tour Guide (Brian Mars)
 2005: Dead Zone (TV Series) - A Very Dead Zone Christmas (Smalltime Drug Dealer)
 2006: Underworld Evolution - Death Dealer #2
 2006: The Perfect Suspect (TV Series) Sam Lee
 2007: Stargate Atlantis (TV Series) Travelers (Nevik)
 2007: Blood Ties (TV Series) The Good, the Bad and the Ugly (Charles)
 2007: Supernatural (TV Series) Houses of the Holy (Man)
 2009: Harper's Island (TV Series) (Joel Booth)
 2009: One By One: The Making of 'Harper's Island (Video Short) (Joel Booth) 
 2009: Casting 'Harper's Island (Video Short) (Joel Booth)
 2010: Fringe (TV Series) Johari Window (Glen Brown)
 2010: Psych (TV Series) You Can't Handle This Episode (Lt. Wallach)
 2010: Smallville (TV Series) Conspiracy (Lenkov)
 2011: Fairly Legal (TV Series) Pilot (Brian Michaels)
 2011: Grave Encounters (Lance Preston)
 2012: Grave Encounters 2 (Lance Preston/Himself)
 2013: 12 Rounds 2: Reloaded (Sykes)
 2017: Concrete Evidence: Fixer Upper Mysteries (Sean Brogans)
 2018: Deadly Deed: Fixer Upper Mysteries (Sean Brogans)
 2019: Z (Kevin)

References

External links
 

Living people
1977 births
Canadian male film actors
Canadian male television actors
Male actors from Alberta